Syacium is a genus of large-tooth flounders found in the Atlantic and Pacific Oceans. With the exception of S. guineensis from the Atlantic coast of Africa, all species are from the Americas. The largest species in the genus reaches  in length.

Species
There are currently eight recognized species in this genus:
 Syacium guineensis (Bleeker, 1862) (Papillose flounder)
 Syacium gunteri Ginsburg, 1933 (Shoal flounder)
 Syacium latifrons (D. S. Jordan & C. H. Gilbert, 1882) (Beach flounder)
 Syacium longidorsale Murakami & Amaoka, 1992 (Longfin flounder)
 Syacium maculiferum (Garman, 1899) (Clearspot flounder)
 Syacium micrurum Ranzani, 1842 (Channel flounder)
 Syacium ovale (Günther, 1864) (Oval flounder)
 Syacium papillosum (Linnaeus, 1758) (Dusky flounder)

References

Paralichthyidae
Marine fish genera
Taxa named by Camillo Ranzani